Gabriel Escobar Mascuñano (born 22 July 1996) is a Spanish amateur boxer who won gold medals at the 2018 EU Championships, 2018 Mediterranean Games, and 2019 European Games.

References

External links
 
 
 
 

1996 births
Living people
Spanish male boxers
Flyweight boxers
Southpaw boxers
Competitors at the 2018 Mediterranean Games
Mediterranean Games medalists in boxing
Mediterranean Games gold medalists for Spain
Boxers at the 2019 European Games
European Games medalists in boxing
European Games gold medalists for Spain
People from Leganés
Sportspeople from the Community of Madrid
Boxers at the 2020 Summer Olympics
Olympic boxers of Spain
21st-century Spanish people